La'cryma Christi (Latin for "The Tears of Christ") was a Japanese visual kei rock band originally active from 1991 to 2007. At their peak, they were considered one of "the big four of visual kei" alongside Fanatic Crisis, Malice Mizer and Shazna. They reunited for a concert in 2009 at the V-Rock Festival, for their short reunion tour in 2010, and for a 15th anniversary tour in 2012.

History
The band was originally formed in 1991 under the name of Strippe-D Lady by vocalist and leader Taka with his college friend and neighbor, Hiro. The two friends held a small audition in Kansai to find new talent for the band. They recruited bassist Kita-J and drummer Sima-Chan, although Sima-Chan was later replaced by Levin, who invited his high school friend, Koji, to join the band as the second guitarist. This Osaka based band played hard rock and heavy metal during this time period. In October 1994, Kita-J decided to leave the band and was replaced by Jun and later Shuse, who had played in the same band as Taka in the past.

After this the band changed their name to La'cryma Christi before releasing their first single, "Siam's Eye", on a local indies label in 1994. The band moved to Tokyo in 1996, releasing their first mini album, Warm Snow, which sold 15,000 copies. In 1997 they signed with a major label and debuted with "Ivory Trees". The album Dwellers of Sand Castle was named one of the top albums from 1989-1998 in a 2004 issue of the music magazine Band Yarouze. Their single "Mirai Kōro" was used as the ending for the anime Nightwalker: The Midnight Detective and reached No. 3 on the Oricon singles chart.

They founded their own label, Majestic Ring, in 2003. Koji left the band after a gig on March 21, 2005, and in September 2006 the band announced that they would officially disband in January 2007.

Koji formed ALvino in 2006, with former Pierrot member Jun. Taka and Hiro formed the band Libraian in 2007. In 2009, Hiro became a support guitarist for Creature Creature, the solo project of Morrie from Dead End. He also contributes compositions to the band, including "Dream Caller", the lead track of their 2009 album Inferno. Levin played with several artists including Toshi with T-Earth, while Shuse played with acts such as Acid Black Cherry and 44Magnum, and in 2010 formed †яi￠к.

La'cryma Christi, including Koji, reunited for one night at the V-Rock Festival on October 21, 2009. There they announced their reunion tour, La'cryma Christi Resurrection ~Final Prayer~, which started on January 12, 2010 and ended on February 1.

La'cryma Christi's song "With-You" was covered by DaizyStripper on the compilation Crush! -90's V-Rock Best Hit Cover Songs-, which was released on January 26, 2011 and features current visual kei bands covering songs from bands that were important to the '90s visual kei movement. Their song "Mirai Kōro" was covered by Blu-Billion on its sequel, Crush! 2 -90's V-Rock Best Hit Cover Songs-, that released on November 23, 2011.

In 2012, La'cryma Christi performed a 15th anniversary tour from May 8 to July 29. At the final show, another concert was announced for September 30 at Shibuya-AX.

Rhythm guitarist Koji passed away on April 15, 2022 from esophageal cancer.

Members
Former members
 Taka – lead vocals, keyboards (1991–2007, 2009–2010, 2012)
 Hiro – lead guitar, backing vocals (1991–2007, 2009–2010, 2012)
 Koji – rhythm guitar, backing vocals (1992–2005, 2009–2010, 2012)
 Shuse – bass, backing vocals (1994–2007, 2009–2010, 2012)
 Levin – drums (1992–2007, 2009–2010, 2012)
 Sima-Chan – drums (as Strippe-D Lady)
 Kita-J – bass (as Strippe-D Lady)
 Jun – bass (as Strippe-D Lady)

Influences
Shuse listed Mötley Crüe, Ozzy Osbourne, U2, Duran Duran, Foo Fighters, Linkin Park, 44 Magnum, Dead End, The Beatles, Jellyfish and Kiss in his favorite bands list. Hiro cited Dead End as a favorite band. Koji's favorite was Van Halen.

Yomi from Nightmare covered La'cryma Christi in his high school days.

Discography

Demo tapes
 "Stay Close Tonight" (October 9, 1993)
 "Stripped-D Lady" (January 1994)

Singles
 "Siam's Eye" (October 7, 1994), Oricon Singles Chart Peak Position: No. 25
 "Forest" (March 13, 1997) No. 50
 "Ivory Trees" (May 8, 1997) No. 22
 "The Scent" (July 30, 1997.07.30) No. 23
  No. 25
 "With-You" (May 8, 1998) No. 10
  No. 3
 "In Forest" (November 11, 1998) No. 8
 "Without You" (May 26, 1999) No. 8
  No. 9
 "Lime Rain" (January 19, 2000) No. 15
 "Life" (November 22, 2000) No. 27
 "Jump!!" (October 24, 2001) No. 27
  No. 26
 "Hirameki" (December 4, 2002) No. 26
 "Mystical Glider" (March 26, 2003)
 "Groove Weapon" (July 30, 2003) No. 44
 "Cannonball" (April 21, 2004) No. 50
 "Hot Rod Circuit" (August 11, 2004) No. 65
 "Yesterdays" (March 23, 2005) No. 40
 "Sweet Lil' Devil" (June 6, 2006)
 "Breaking" (August 23, 2006) No. 108

Studio albums
 Warm Snow (February 4, 1996)
 Dwellers of Sand Castle (July 22, 1996), Oricon Albums Chart Peak Position: No. 71
 Sculpture of Time (November 12, 1997) No. 8
 Lhasa (November 25, 1998) No. 8
 Magic Theater (March 15, 2000) No. 22
 &.U (March 6, 2002) No. 36
 Deep Space Syndicate (November 5, 2003) No. 42
 Zeus (May 25, 2005) No. 59
 Where the Earth is Rotting Away (September 27, 2006) No. 79

Compilation albums
 Single Collection (June 28, 2000) No. 9
 Greatest - Hits (September 8, 2004) No. 66
 Sound & Vision The Singles + Selection from Live "Decade" (June 28, 2006) No. 240
 La'cryma Christi Singles + Clips (January 1, 2010, CD and DVD)

Live albums
 The 10th Anniversary Live "Decade" 1st Day (October 7, 2009)
 The 10th Anniversary Live "Decade" 2nd Day (October 7, 2009)
 The 10th Anniversary Live "Decade" 3rd Day (October 7, 2009)
 La’cryma Christi Tour Mirai Kouro 1998.8.28 Tokyo International Forum Hall A (October 7, 2009)
 La’cryma Christi Live at Lhasa 1999.3.31 Nippon Budokan (October 7, 2009)
 La’cryma Christi Tour Angolmois 1999.9.4 Yokohama Marina (October 7, 2009)
 La'cryma Christi Resurrection -The CD Box- (April 21, 2010, 10-CD box set)
 2009.10.24 V-Rock Festival'09 at Makuhari Messe (1CD)
 2010.1.18 Final Prayer at Zepp Tokyo (2CD)
 2010.1.19 Final Prayer at Zepp Tokyo (2CD)
 2010.2.13 The Final at Shibuya C.C.Lemon Hall (2CD)
 2010.2.14 The Final at Shibuya C.C.Lemon Hall (3CD)

Home videos
 Glass Castle (March 1997)
 4U (February 11, 1998)
 Zero (December 24, 1998)
 Live at Lhasa (June 30, 1999)
 True Color (December 22, 1999)
 4U・True Color (May 31, 2000)
 Six Visions (June 30, 2004), Oricon DVDs Chart Peak Position: No. 65
 The 10th Anniversary Live "Decade" (March 31, 2005)
 Last Live "White Period" (August 8, 2007)
 The 10th Anniversary Live "Decade" 1st Day (October 7, 2009)
 The 10th Anniversary Live "Decade" 2nd Day (October 7, 2009)
 The 10th Anniversary Live "Decade" 3rd Day (October 7, 2009)
 La’cryma Christi Tour Mirai Kouro 1998.8.28 Tokyo International Forum Hall A (October 7, 2009)
 La’cryma Christi Live at Lhasa 1999.3.31 Nippon Budokan (October 7, 2009)
 La’cryma Christi Tour Angolmois 1999.9.4 Yokohama Marina (October 7, 2009)
 La'cryma Christi Resurrection -The DVD Box- (April 21, 2010, 5 DVD box set)
 2009.10.24 V-Rock Festival'09 at Makuhari Messe (1DVD)
 2010.1.19 Final Prayer at Zepp Tokyo (2DVD)
 2010.2.14 The Final at Shibuya C.C.Lemon Hall (2DVD)

References

 Barks Profile (Japanese)

External links
 Official website
 Official Facebook
 Official Twitter
 Official Universal Music page

Toy's Factory artists
Visual kei musical groups
Japanese progressive rock groups
Japanese hard rock musical groups
Musical groups from Osaka
Musical groups established in 1991
Musical groups disestablished in 2007
Musical groups reestablished in 2009
Musical groups reestablished in 2012
Musical quintets
1991 establishments in Japan
2012 disestablishments in Japan